Gymnopilus dulongjiangensis is a species of mushroom in the family Hymenogastraceae. Found in China, it was described as new to science in 1987 by Mu Zang.

See also

List of Gymnopilus species

References

Fungi described in 1987
Fungi of China
dulongjiangensis